Caecilia guntheri is a species of caecilian in the family Caeciliidae. It is found in Colombia and Ecuador. Its natural habitat is subtropical or tropical moist montane forests.

References

guntheri
Amphibians of Colombia
Amphibians of Ecuador
Amphibians described in 1942
Taxonomy articles created by Polbot